Euphaedra occulta is a butterfly in the family Nymphalidae. It is found in Guinea.

Taxonomy
It is possibly just an aberration of Euphaedra janetta.

References

Butterflies described in 1982
occulta
Endemic fauna of Guinea
Butterflies of Africa